Albula Region is one of the eleven administrative districts in the canton of Graubünden in Switzerland. It was created on 1 January 2017 as part of a reorganization of the Canton.

Mergers
 On 1 January 2018 the former municipalities of Bergün/Bravuogn and Filisur merged into the new municipality of Bergün Filisur.

References

Regions of Graubünden